Nuestra Belleza Latina 2011 was the fifth season of Nuestra Belleza Latina and the fifth season to be aired on Univision. The season premiered on Sunday March 6, 2011 at 8pm/7c and concluded on May 22, 2011.

Auditions for the show were held in January and February 2011 in the cities of Chicago, San Antonio, New York City, Los Angeles, Miami, and San Juan, Puerto Rico. During the audition process, 73 women were given passes to the semi-finals in Miami. Two contestants were chosen from online Auditions, with the help of public votes.

The winner of the competition was Nastassja Bolívar from Nicaragua. She received a contract with Univision, $250,000 in cash and prizes, a correspondent position on El Gordo y la Flaca and the opportunity to reign as Nuestra Belleza Latina for a year.

Auditions

Open casting calls for the show were held in the cities listed below:

 January 6, 2011 in Chicago, Illinois
 January 15, 2011 in San Antonio, Texas
 January 20, 2011 in Los Angeles, California
 January 29, 2011 in San Juan, Puerto Rico
 February 5, 2011 in New York City, New York
 February 19, 2011 in Miami, Florida

Separate online auditions were held throughout, from January 6 to February 19 on the show's website. The public was allowed to select two contestants from the online auditions to advance to the semi-finals.

Cast

Contestants
(Ages stated are at time of contest)

Judges

Episodes

Episode 1
Original air date: March 6, 2011

The episode was a compilation from all of the auditions that had been held during the two months prior, and featured several guest appearances at panel from various celebrities. In order to receive a pass for boot camp in Miami, each aspiring contestant had to score a minimum of at least five points during her interview.

 Guest judges: Eddie "Piolín" Sotelo (Los Angeles), Julian Gil (Puerto Rico, New York City), Jackie Guerrido (Chicago), Vadhir Derbez (Texas), Carlos Calderón (Miami)

Episode 2
Original air date: March 13, 2011

The fist group of contestants selected during the auditions were flown to Miami, where they received training and classes in diction, choreography, fitness, and runway. Those not up for the challenge were eliminated by the judges. The remaining semifinalists at the end of the first week had a runway presentation in swimwear during the first live gala, and had to explain why the should be chosen as the winner of the competition. Two of the semifinalists (Altagracia Garcia and Natasha Rodriguez) had to drop out of the running due to health concerns. At the end of the week, only 12 semi-finalists remained.

Semi-finalists from group 1:

 The contestant was chosen as one of the top 12 among that group and advanced into the top 24.
 The contestant quit the competition.

 Special guest: Prince Royce

Episode 3
Original air date: March 20, 2011

The second group of hopefuls was flown to Miami for their lessons and training. At the end of the week only 24 semi-finalists remained. After a series of challenges during the second live gala, the judges chose the final 12 contestants from group two, who would advance into the top 24 to fight for a place in the beauty mansion.

Semi-finalists from group 2:

 The contestant was chosen as one of the top 12 among that group and advanced into the top 24.

 Special guest: Gloria Trevi

Episode 4
Original air date: March 27, 2011

The remaining 24 semi-finalists from both groups received makeovers and had a photo shoot session in bikinis. They also took part in their first challenge, which was won by Gredmarie. The three semi-finalists with the most votes, Maribel, Darla, and Gredmarie, received passes into the top 12. One of the semi-finalists, Audris Rijo from the Dominican Republic, decided to drop out of the competition due to a family emergency. Throughout the rest of the night, the judges chose the remaining 9 contestants who would move into the beauty mansion as finalists.

Top 24 semi-finalists:

 The contestant was chosen as one of the top 12 finalists.
 The contestant quit the competition.

 Challenge winner: Gredmarie Colon 
 Special guests: R.K.M & Ken-Y

Episode 5
Original air date: April 3, 2011

The 12 chosen contestants moved into the beauty mansion, and took part in their first challenge, which was won as a group by Maribel, Gredmarie, Diana, Josell, Miriam, and Paulette. The contestants also began a strict regimen of lessons, rehearsals, and exercise in preparation for the live galas every week. For the live portion of the show he contestants took part in a scored challenge in front of the judges, which was won by Nastassja. The three contestants with the fewest votes from the public (Nicole, Patricia, and Yahaira) were automatically nominated for elimination. Of the three, Patricia received the fewest votes overall and had to face the judges for their final decision. The contestants who were safe then had to nominate one of the other two contestants (Nicole or Yahaira) for elimination. They chose Yahaira, who joined Patricia in the bottom two. The judges decided to save Patricia, and Yahaira was eliminated from the competition.

 Main challenge winners: Maribel De Santiago, Gredmarie Colon, Diana Cano, Josell Villa, Miriam Hernandez, and Paulette Acosta
 Live challenge winner: Nastassja Bolivar
 Bottom three: Nicole Suarez, Patricia Corcino, and Yahaira Nuñes
 Bottom two: Patricia Corcino (by popular vote at 4.0%) and Yahaira Nuñes (by fellow contestants)
 Eliminated: Yahaira Nuñes
 Special guests: Lucero and Larry Hernandez

Episode 6

Original Air Date—10 April 2011 The 11 remaining girls hit the runway for an amazing week. At panel one of the girls is eliminated. Another week cardiac output Paulette Acosta, Giselle dancing with the girls and the pace of Tito el Bambino marked the sixth show of Nuestra Belleza Latina 2011. The 11 participants were subjected to two major tests during the week: report from a construction site through any obstacle and a pole dancing sensual dance where they had to demonstrate their agility as athletes and dancers at the challenge of pole dancing. Pretty generally conductive, Giselle Blondet, is responsible for encouraging girls during the tests but this time wanted to show solidarity with them and learn the choreography of the show opening. The audience went crazy when Giselle went to the dance floor to shake your hips to the rhythm of mambo and demonstrate that if they compete, the girls would be in serious trouble to snatch the crown. This challenge was held secret for a week and eleven girls did not know what to expect when they arrived at the location, in miniskirts and heels. Once there were reported to be reported from a construction site without suspecting that the production would submit to all sorts of obstacles to measuring the calm before the cameras in front of unexpected situations. When Nuestra Belleza Latina participants were in full report at all surprised by the sound of a drilling machine that kept driving their interviews or listen to their interviews. All of them will cast a valde of water and mud as they were about to close his report that helped the jury to measure who responded and who are naturally frozen on camera. If you thought the treacherous catwalk last week was difficult, the challenges of this week confirmed that this competition is getting tougher. During the week the candidates had to rehearse sexy choreography, in which used as tools from chairs to a tube, activity that was not all easy because each had to demonstrate physical dexterity and could not always look as seductive as intended. Our dear Charytín was encouraging them and watching their development to qualify. Diana Cano was really distressed testing tube and surprised all with his shyness and concern about what your coworkers think of her Wall Street. Darla proved to be the most agile of the group, and a good companion to teach Gredmarie their best moves. After the challenges came time to decide. They announced the candidate with fewer votes from the public and the two who had received worse grades on the challenges. The girl with the fewest public votes was Paulette Acosta, and she joined Villa and Diana Cano Jocell with lower qualifications. It's time for the girls to save someone and no one would believe to be saved. Nothing more, nothing less than Diana Cano, the most direct of all participants. In front of the judges were Jocell and Paulette Villa Acosta, the latter being the judges decided to eliminate. We are consenting to our audience and because you asked Tito "El Bambino" will be responsible to make everyone dance to its rhythm. So do not forget to vote for your artist consented to appear at the next gala. The first intrigues and rivalries between Jocell Villa, Paulette Acosta, Diana Cano, Maribel Santiago, Nastassja Bolivar, Miriam Hernandez, Darla Delgado, Julieta Cabrera, Nicole Smith, Patricia Corcoran and Columbus Gredmarie have already emerged, but who of them will next to leave? Hopefully your good luck charms they can use to continue in the competition.

 Challenge of the week winner: Nicole Suarez
 Guest Artist: Tito El Bambino
 Mini-Challenge Winner: "Pole Dancing" Patricia Corcino (29 points)
 First Call-Out (At the Final Runway): Nastassja Bolivar
 Given the opportunity to save fellow Contestant: Nicole Suarez
 Bottom Three: Jocell Villa, Diana Cano and Paulette Acosta
 Sent to bottom two by Viewers Lowest Percentage of votes: Paulette Acosta 3.8%
 Sent to bottom two by fellow Contestants: Jocell Villa
 Saved by the Judges: Jocell Villa
 Eliminated: Paulette Acosta

Episode 7

Original Air Date—17 April 2011 The 10 remaining girls hit the runway for an amazing week. Someone gets expelled due to breaking rules. Someone from their past returns into the competition. Members of the production are just as surprised as you, threatening to have a heart attack if this season continues with the weekly riots which completely change the dynamics of each domingo. Embarazos Nuestra Belleza Latina hidden illness, resignations and Rijo Audris Osmel Sousa and this week the scandal that forced Cabrera to leave the competition. Before addressing the issue of Juliette, we saw what happened in the week. There's tests of skill and there is evidence of honesty. And in the latter won, surprise, Diana Cano. The girls had to write a private letter several truths of others and of themselves without knowing that such contents be revealed to all. And what's that ensued when revelaron. Maribel De Santiago lost her temper and Diana Cano accused of being a liar, screaming. Diana Cano did not pay much attention because in this show with great sadness she was reminded of her ex-boyfriend and shed many tears for him showing that she is vulnerable and has a good heart. The girls were asked to seal their letters and pledge their veracity and only Diana Cano had the courage to seal her letter with her name. Although Miriam Hernández seemed shy and coy, she left all the girls shocked. This week Miriam and Juliette had a heated argument. Miriam called Juliette a "prostitute" and Juliette threw water at Miriam, causing Miriam to react by throwing a plate of food at Miriam.  The challenge of the week was marred by some compromising photos of Juliette Cabrera that emerged in social networks and the internet. Juliette posed suggestively and production met to define whether this violated the official rules of competition must abide by all the judges participantes. Los Cabrera explained that Juliet was not on trial for his life, but for violating the rules and because the public viralizó their photos by creating this scandal. Production determined that her photos were objectionable and that they violated the rules that they all signed up to participate in the competition as Juliet Cabrera left the competencia. Pero which would be the surprise when he left Juliet Cabrera announced the entry of the girls that was previously deleted. Who would? Before this big announcement, we review the challenge of chicas .El Nuestra Belleza Latina challenge this week was won by which they were physically better prepared because they had to imitate the training routine performed by the Fire Department Broward County. It was not only so, but do it as fast possible. The participants faced an extreme challenge in a large building where there was everything: a lot of weight on the body, a dark room, alleged victims, a lot of adrenaline and physical exertion, but next to very handsome men. The success of the test depended on the ability of girls to work in pairs (although some were uneven). Production divided them: Juliet Cabrera and Miriam Hernandez, Diana Cano and Maribel De Santiago, Gredmarie Columbus and Nicole Smith, Darla Delgado and finally Villa Jocell Nastassja Bolivar and Patricia Corcino. The winners were Patricia Corcino and Nastassja Bolivar who were rewarded with a dinner with Alejandro Chaban and assist Giselle Blondet at the Mana concert in Miami.

The music guest was Joey Montana who sang his song "Ta Melodía". The competition was made more difficult as former 2003 Miss Universe Amelia Vega from the Dominican Republic announced the challenge of the week. Amelia was like a fairy godmother for girls and accompanied them during their visit to the Miami Zoo to test the challenge of judges and that was the wildest of the season. The test was to enter a cave with reptiles; Nastassja Bolivar stopped to cry because she has a phobia of snakes. A paramedic had to measure her tension in the dressing room to monitor their anxiety, but found that was able to continue. Curiously, despite her fear, Nastassja Bolivar won the second best score for this challenge with 26 points after Darla Delgado who scored 28 points. Jocell Villa received the lowest score, followed by Nicole Suarez and Diana Cano. Nicole Suarez and Jocell Villa were in front of the judges and they saved Nicole Suarez. With much pain the show said goodbye to the beautiful Jocell Villa.

 Challenge of the week winner: Patricia Corcino and Nastassja Bolivar
 Guest Artist: Maná and Joe Montana
 Mini-Challenge Winner: "Reptile Cave/Amazonian Interview" Darla Delgado
 First Call-Out (At the Final Runway): Gredmarie Colon
 Given the opportunity to save fellow Contestant: Nastassja Bolivar
 Bottom Three: Diana Cano, Nicole Suarez, Jocell Villa
 Sent to bottom two by Viewers Lowest Percentage of votes: Nicole Suarez 8.6%
 Sent to bottom two by fellow Contestants: Jocell Villa
 Saved by the Judges: Nicole Suarez
 Re-Entered the Competition: Jenny Arzola
 Automatic Expulsion: Juliete Cabrera
 Eliminated: Jocell Villa

Episode 8

Original Air Date—24 April 2011 The 9 remaining girls hit the runway for an amazing week. At panel one of the girls is eliminated. Julián Gil's anger when Macho Camacho put his fist in his face, the big kiss Giselle Blondet Sebastián Rulli during a spontaneous action scene, the dance between commercial Lupita, Osmel, Julian and the alleged girlfriend Marjorie. And among all the show that gave us the judges and the driver, one of the girls won $10.000 on the challenge of the week, all boxed, served with black wig and one of them played a production fue. Finalmente fantasy girls: stick a fist in a boxing ring! Miriam Hernandez Nicole Smith hit very hard, if I wanted to hit Diana Cano according to comments he made about her and Latinos who use implants to increase her bust. He said he would have loved to hit the implants and the Corcoran extensiones. Patricia hit Darla Delgado without even suspecting that the two would eventually removed during the show. Jenny Arzola and Maribel Santiago fought in his first challenge of the competition, which came last week when Juliet Cabrera was thrown out of Nuestra Belleza Latina. Some pictures objectionable she did before entering the show appeared on network and violated the rules of the worst competencia. Pero standing in the boxing challenge was Judge Julian Gil, who competed against the boxer 'El Macho' Camacho in began as a demonstration of taps until Julian wanted to make the brave and gave a heavy blow. The Macho unleashed his animal instincts and started golpearlo. Julián Gil was grievous in the gym and yelled "bully" the boxer, who in turn gave him an actor Sebastián Rulli empujón.El novel Teresa participated in the challenge of judges and helped the girls to practice their scripts for the special guests were semana.as girls Horoscopos de Durango, Vicky and Marisol, who put a lot of rhythm to the show and gave good advice to the finalists. The live audience at the show's taping couldn't believed what happened during the breaks. It became a party when Lupita Jones got on top of the judges' table and danced to Shakira's song "Loca/Crazy." Giselle Blondet and Osmel Sousa danced and paraded down the catwalk killed in laughter, and Julian Gil was called by Giselle to dance with his girlfriend, Venezuelan actress Marjorie Sousa. The challenge was to play Cherry, a wannabe star of Teresa, and all they had to interpret the scene with the same dress and the same wig. The first was Maribel Santiago who cried throughout her performance and received the lowest score of the judges. Diana Cano received the worst score of the judges and the dreaded zero Osmel Sousa. Miriam Hernandez, Patricia Corcoran, Columbus and Nasstassja Gredmarie Bolivar stressed in their interpretation and the new, Jenny Arzola, hit a kiss so passionate Sebastián Rulli Julian Gil shrugged off points for "aggressive." But when Giselle Blondet improvised their own scene with Sebastián Rulli and ended up kissing passionately in the studio audience went wild and applauded Giselle. The inevitable sadness of seeing a girl leave the competition finally arrived. The girl with the fewest votes from the public was Patricia Corcino. The remaining two girls who were threatened were Darla Delgado and Diana Cano. Darla Delgado and Patricia Corcino were sent in front of the judges, who decided not to use the wild card that allows them to save two girls instead of one. The judges decided to save Patricia Corcino and eliminated Darla Delgado.

 Challenge of the week winner: Nicole Suarez
 Guest Artist: Los Horóscopos de Durango
 Guest Celebrity in Challenge: Sebastián Rulli
 Mini-Challenge Winner: "Cereza" Gredmarie Colon
 First Call-Out (At the Final Runway): Miriam Hernandez
 Given the opportunity to save fellow Contestant: Nicole Suarez
 Bottom Three: Diana Cano, Patricia Corcino, Darla Delgado
 Sent to bottom two by Viewers Lowest Percentage of votes: Patricia Corcino
 Sent to bottom two by fellow Contestants: Tied. Darla Delgado 9.1%, Diana Cano 10%
 Saved by the Judges: Patricia Corcino
 Eliminated: Darla Delgado

Episode 9

Original Air Date—1 May 2011 The 8 remaining girls hit the runway for an amazing week. At panel shocking news occurred when Maribel De Santiago, one of the most loved contestants, was eliminated. The night began with a "dance of opening" between the participants and 8 Univision talent who were invited to dance with the contestants. Also, the announcement was made that four members of Nuestra Belleza Latina are part of the 50 Most Beautiful People in Spanish : Giselle Blondet, Lupita Jones, Julian Gil and Gredmarie Colon. The challenge of the week was sponsored by Subway and dealt with a good diet combined with exercise. All the beauties were given the mission to conduct a cooking show with a segment of exercises, so Ingrid Hoffman was responsible for giving the nod to the first part. In the routine physical context was reviewed by the expert Jose Fernandez. After deliberation, the winner of this week was Nasstajsa Bolivar, who took $10,000 home. But the real challenge was to come with "Dancing with the stars." Each of the participants had as a talent partner Univision, with which they had to dance to perfection to achieve the best score and stay alive in the competition. The first to hit the dance floor was Gredmarie Colón, Rafael Mercadante who danced with the song "Yo No Fui", played by Pedro Fernández. After Jenny Arzola appeared with Tony Dandrades to participate with "Next Friday" by Espinoza Paz. The third place went to Nastassja Bolivar, who along with Poncho de Anda danced "She shakes" by NG2. The next stop was for Miriam Hernández Carlos Calderón, who together did the choreography for "The Punishment" by David Bisbal. Patricia Corcoran accounted for as a couple Raúl González and together they made the steps of "Laugh and Cry" by Celia Cruz. Diana Cano Rodolfo Jimenez teamed up to dance with "One More Night" by J Lo. Near the end of a round of introductions was the turn of Maribel Santiago, who along with Felipe Viel was tested with "The Plague" by Alejandra Guzmán. To close the trial the jury Nicole Smith participated with Johnny Lozada and the song "Pollera Colora" by Yuri. Who do you think she danced better? Decision time scores and disadvantaged were Maribel (who also received the harshest criticism of the jury), Diana and Jenny. However, only Diana is spared to reach the final instance, it was rescued by his companions. Then came the time to meet the deleted and to the surprise of many, Maribel was out of Nuestra Belleza Latina. The commotion was general and even the judge of iron, Osmel Sousa, recognized the work done Maribel from the stage of auditions.

Dancing with the Stars
(Individual judges scores in the chart below (given in parentheses) are listed in this order from left to right:Julian Gil, Lupita Jones and Osmel Sousa)

Special Guest at Mansion:

 Guest Artist: None
 Challenge of the week winner: Nastassja Bolivar
 Guest Celebrity in Challenge: Raúl González, Rodolfo Jiménez, Alfonso de Anda, Carlos Calderón, Rafael Mercadante, Johnny Lozada, Felipe Viel, Tony Andrade
 Mini-Challenge Winner: "Dancing with the Stars" Gredmarie Colon
 First Call-Out (At the Final Runway): Patricia Corcino
 Given the opportunity to save fellow Contestant: Nastassja Bolivar
 Bottom Three: Diana Cano, Jenny Arzola, Maribel De Santiago
 Sent to bottom two by Viewers Lowest Percentage of votes: Jenny Arzola 8.3%
 Sent to bottom two by fellow Contestants: Maribel De Santiago
 Saved by the Judges: Jenny Arzola
 Eliminated: Maribel De Santiago

Episode 10

Original Air Date—8 May 2011 The seven remaining girls hit the runway for an amazing week. The girls make a special dance for mothers day. The seven must answer difficult questions at panel. At panel the six Finalist are announced. In past editions, some participants were displayed as the strongest in the tournament but this year it has been different since each gala has surprised us with strange and unexpected eliminations. The best challenge of the season no doubt was held at the offices of NuestraBellezaLatina.com where Jenny Arzola, Gredmarie Colon, Patricia Corcino, Diana Cano, Nastassja Bolivar, Miriam Hernandez and Nicole Suarez were assigned each with a photo of a celebrity in which they would have to transform and imitate. The girls were glammed up and combed to imitate each photo but it was difficult to imitate the perfect pose and attitude in a photo shoot with photographer Felipe Cuevas, under the guidance of a master of imitation, Mexican actress Angélica Vale. Angélica Vale, star of our next web novel, No Me Hallo, determined that Miriam Hernandez, who imitated Shaila Dúrcal, was the best photograph and was awarded $1,000 on Univision MasterCard card. She also received a professional photo shoot for her portfolio. The reward challenge was led by the famous brand JCPenney, and in honor of Mother's Day the girl's mothers would be part of the weekly activity. The girls paraded with their mothers, except Diana Cano and Hernández Miriam who marched with her best friend and grandmother respectively. One of the most emotional moments of this gala was the message that Diana Cano received from her mother who was in Ecuador, Diana cried and proved once again that she is not as cold and strong as she looks. The winners of this challenge were Nasstassja Bolivar and her mother who celebrated with many hugs and kisses. JCPenney taught the girls how to dress for the spring season in the virtual closet. Dancing with the most handsome guys from Univision in Episode 9 was a success but not easy, dancing different genres had been a task that required much effort, but it falls short of what the girls lived in the tenth gala where they had to present TV segments and were coached by Bárbara Bermudo, Chiquinquirá Delgado, Marisa del Portillo, Lili Estefan, Maria Elena Salinas, Jackie Guerrido and Lourdes Stephen. The girls moved their bodies to the rhythm grupero Intocable. The guys from this band prepared a great show of good humor to put our beloved "iron judge" Osmel Sousa to dance. Jenny Arzola from Cuba went straight to the judges for having the fewest votes. Nasstasja Bolivar and Diana Cano were also in the bottom three, but the other contestants saved Nastassja. In the end, Diana went with Jenny to face the judges. Diana Cano was eliminated by the judges in the tenth gala, after being saved several times by her fellow contestants.

Nuestra Belleza Anchor

 Challenge of the week winner: Miriam Hernandez and Nastassja Bolivar
 Guest Artist: Intocable
 Mini-Challenge Winner: "Nuestra Belleza Anchor" Patricia Corcino
 First Call-Out (At the Final Runway): Nicole Suarez
 Given the opportunity to save fellow Contestant: None
 Bottom Three: Diana Cano, Jenny Arzola and Nastassja Bolivar
 Sent to bottom two by Viewers Lowest Percentage of votes: Jenny Arzola 11.6%
 Sent to bottom two by fellow Contestants: Diana Cano
 Saved by the Judges: Jenny Arzola
 Eliminated: Diana Cano

Episode 11

Original Air Date—15 May 2011 The 6 remaining girls hit the runway for an amazing week. The six must answer difficult questions at panel. At panel for the first time, two girls are eliminated leaving only four finalist in finale. The final pre-gala was fraught with tension and tears and leaving the Mexican and Puerto Rican Miriam Hernandez Patricia Corcino. Of the twelve participants were the four that Apiro to the crown on Sunday: Nasstasja Bolivar, Gredmarie Columbus, Nicole Smith and Jenny Arzola. Look for everything that happened on this show and its evolution in a bikini. The girls were taken to the warm beaches of Miami but not walk, but to pose as the great and demonstrate proficiency to the perfection that the tinkering with the cameras. What they did not expect is that the production they had a terrible play on the beach waiting for: a group of actors pretending to be fans who came to talk with them and criticized terriblemente. Las girls had to report from the beach when these People came and verbally assaulted. Nastassja Bolivar told him he had a big nose, Patricia Corcino that was operated at Columbus, Gredmarie was hypocritical. The challenge, without them knowing it, was to remain calm and knew how to handle these situations. time passed the test and after anti fans know that the actors were able to relax and pose in a bikini. During the show saw its transformation from the first pose in bikini with the auditions so far, you can revive in the photo albums on the right. Vote for the best transformation of bikinis. The final $10,000 of the competition would take the runner to write and interpret more realistic commercial toothpastes. The lucky was Nicole Smith, who has won a total of $21,000 in accumulated challenges. Karla Martínez was the judge and found that Nicole was the most artículada. El challenge of the judges was the most difficult. A panel of communication experts raised questions live every girl and they had 30 seconds to responder. El panel comprised Rodner Figueroa, Carlos Alvarez of Univision Radio. Klove 107.5, actor Mark Tacher, publisher of Latina magazine, Angie Romero and celebrity reporters of TVyNovelas Luis Alfonso Hernandez Borrego. Miriam disarmed after the challenge because he felt that he had answered the question as immigration that hicieron. Los Chino & Nacho Venezuelans were in charge of livening up the show with their hit Tu Angelito I, where the girls paraded when Victoria's Secret models in a bikini beautiful and even more beautiful wings. It was a really spectacular show worthy of a semifinal. Tears and more tears. This removal was full of stress and tension. The two girls with fewer votes were Patricia Corcoran and Jenny Arzola, and this time was that Patricia competencia. Los left the judges had to give a golden pass to final rest. A Nasstasja Miriam and made them suffer and told them he would answer at the end of the show. The other girls could not stop with much excitement and applause from the judges deliberated público. Los in public because some were betting on Nasstasja Miriam and others. Giselle asked that saved both but Osmel announced that it would save one. And the choice to go to the final was Nasstasja Bolívar. Miriam Hernandez was the last cut before the final and would not give interviews onslaught of emotion.

The Final Question

 Challenge of the week winner: Nicole Suarez
 Guest Artist: Chino & Nacho
 Guest in Mini-Challenge: Carlos Alvarez, Luis Alfonso Borego, Sara Moreno, Mark Thacher, Angie Romero and Rodner Figueroa
 Mini-Challenge Winner: "The Final Question" Nicole Suarez
 First Call-Out (At the Final Runway): Gredmarie Colon
 Bottom Two (Lowest Percentage of votes): Jenny Arzola and Patricia Corcino
 Bottom Two (By the judges): Nastassja Bolivar and Miriam Hernandez
 Saved by the Judges: Nastassja Bolivar
 Eliminated (Lowest Percentage of votes): Patricia Corcino 11.9%
 Eliminated (By the judges): Miriam Hernandez

Episode 12

Original Air Date—22 May 2011 The 4 remaining girls hit the runway to find who will be Nuestra Belleza Latina 2011. After five months of uncertainty (the first hearing began on January 8) of tears, trials, eliminations and talent, the Nicaraguan Nasstasja Bolívar was crowned on Sunday May 22 Nuestra Belleza Latina 2011. The final gala of Nuestra Belleza Latina was a moving tribute to the four finalists in the competition: Gredmarie Puerto Colon, Bolivar Nasstasja Nicaraguan, Cuban and Colombian Jenny Arzola Nicole Suarez. The four finalists for Nuestra Belleza Latina 2011 opened the show with a dance spectacular in which they were accompanied by teachers who have been shaping and highlighting his talent for five months. Giselle Blondet and judges, Julian Gil, Lupita Jones and Osmel Sousa jury chairman following the opening with uncertainty and a lot of emotion. The second part of the show was a summary of the final four candidates for the crown. Columbus Gredmarie danced and won a trophy in memory and $1.000 for having achieved the highest score from the judges during the season. Gredmarie last year was among the 24 finalists aspiring to enter the mansion but was a step away from achieving his dream. The Puerto Rican is not paid and invested in 2010 in class to prepare and re-audition, which paid off because today was in the final. The mother and her husband Gredmarie, the duo Alexis & Fido, were in the audience to support her in this very important day for his career. Production showed a video of his father in Iraq, working with the Army and this made her mourn with emotion and pride. Jenny Arzola was one of the stronger players of the 24 finalists but was one step away from entering the mansion. The Cuban received a second chance and was selected by the most votes to enter the mansion to replace Juliette Cabrera, who was disqualified for some pictures of it objectionable that circulated on the Internet. For your talent show chose a Caribbean dance that prepared very well. For the unprepared it was to receive a recorded greeting from his aunt and her goddaughter who made it crumble into tears. Nasstasja Bolivar was another great favorite during the competition in spite of their low proficiency in Spanish, for anyone who struggled as reading aloud, taking diction lessons and practicing at the mansion. In addition Nasstasja charmed her teammates and is one of the few girls who had no brushes with none. Nass talent made his test and received a touching message of her great-grandmother who, as the other finalists, he burst into tears. Nicole Smith has been one of the candidates, as Gredmarie, always had the support of the judges for their ability of speech, however Julián Gil told repeatedly that it would not be enough to win the crown because his personality is not strong, does not shine and is lost in the character of the other competitors. In the test performed a dance talent Nicole mapale and imagine their surprise when his father brought Colombia, which moved a lot. The beautiful, the public and the staff of Nuestra Belleza Latina shouted Luis Fonsi who was responsible for setting the pace and the romance of the night. The Puerto Rican singer presented his latest recording material which is called "Shout." Fonsi also presented along with Ana Patricia González, the queen of 2010, the winner of the poster signed that week after week, special guests were signing Nuestra Belleza Latina. Lucero, Larry Hernandez, Gocho, Horoscopos de Durango, Tito el Bambino, Gloria Trevi, Tony Dizze, Intocable, Joey Montana y Nacho and Luis Fonsi. Of the thousands who left their data NuestraBellezaLatina.com, Julia Mérida, Las Vegas, Nevada, was fortunate to earn it. Additionally, each queen Alejandra Espinoza, Melissa Marty, Greidys Gil and Ana Patricia González-signed five posters each, and thus, five winners also took home queens. The first winner of the individual posters queen of San Francisco, California, and it is Luis Cruz. The second winner is from Clearwater, Florida, and Alejandra Trejo. The third name is Betsali Cintron and York, Pennsylvania. Alvin Zeno, of Millstone, Connecticut, is the fourth lucky. And the last name is Jennifer Ortiz, she is from Peekskill, New York. In all, congratulations and hope you enjoy their prizes. The coaches have stayed away from the views and have always watched from their seats in silence, while training and guiding the participants during the week. They would be professional and physical growth experienced in the mansion and everyone wanted to hear their views. Aarón Díaz and Giselle Blondet acted with them and the girls performed a final dance before announcing the crown, where they were dressed as astronauts. The four finalists went to the Univision Upfront presentation that took place at the New Amsterdam Theatre of the Big Apple. The girls had the opportunity to meet part of the integration with Televisa, Univision's new programming for 2011 and the launch of three new channels. Not only that, and to use their stay to relax and go shopping. Not bad to spoil them days before the final. The judges gave their final comments, but reserved the score. Osmel to close the season finale focused on the fact that Giselle Blondet had kissed many suitors this season but let out to Aarón Díaz. Then came the time of listing. The fourth runner up was Jenny Arzola. The third was Nicole Suarez, the second was Gredmarie Colon and the crown was given to Nasstasja Bolivar. Nasstasja receive prizes valued at $250.000 and a contract with Univision. Will this week in several shows in the chain and queen exercised until next May.

 3rd runner-up: Jenny Arzola 
 2nd runner-up: Nicole Suarez 
 1st runner-up: Gredmarie Colon 
 Nuestra Belleza Latina 2011: Nastassja Bolivar 
 Special guests: Aarón Díaz, Luis Fonsi, Ana Patricia González (2010 winner), Greydis Gil (2009 winner), Melissa Marty (2008 winner), Alejandra Espinoza (2007 winner)

Elimination table

 The contestant was part of the semi-finalists from group 1.
 The contestant was part of the semi-finalists from group 2.
 The contestant won the week's reward challenge.
 The contestant was eliminated.
 The contestant was in the bottom three, but was saved by the other contestants.
 The contestant was in the bottom two.
 The contestant was disqualified from the competition.
 The contestant re-entered the competition, replacing a contestant who was disqualified.
 The contestant was a finalist, but did not win.
 The contestant was the runner-up.
 The contestant won Nuestra Belleza Latina 2011.

Notes
 Juliette was disqualified from the competition after it was revealed on some of the show's online forums that she had taken part in several sexually suggestive photo shoots, which was against the rules for eligibility in the competition. She was replaced by Jenny Arzola, who had been eliminated some weeks prior during the selection of the final 12.
 In episode 8, Darla, Diana, and Patricia received the fewest votes and were in the bottom three. Patricia received the fewest votes overall and had to face the judges for elimination. The contestants who were safe had to decide which of the other two contestants (Darla and Diana) would be facing elimination with Patricia. The votes were evenly split. In order to break the tie, the decision was brought back to the public vote. Among the two, Darla received the second lowest number of votes, landing her in the bottom two. Diana was saved by default. 
 During the week of the semifinal, there were two separate eliminations. The first was based entirely on the results of the viewer vote, Jenny and Patricia received the fewest votes, but Patricia received the fewest votes overall, resulting in her elimination. During the remainder of the evening, Gredmarie, Nicole, and Jenny received gold 'passes' for the grand finale. The last pass was left between Miriam and Nastassja. The judges decided to save Nastassja, and Miriam was eliminated.

References

External links 
 Nuestra Belleza Latina - Official Page 

Univision original programming
Nuestra Belleza Latina